Constantine Josef, Hereditary Prince of Löwenstein-Wertheim-Rosenberg (28 September 1802, in Kleinheubach, near Miltenberg – 27 December 1838, in Kleinheubach), was the eldest son and heir of Charles Thomas, Prince of Löwenstein-Wertheim-Rosenberg and his wife, Sophie of Windisch-Graetz. He died before his father.

Family
His paternal grandparents were Dominic Constantine, Prince of Löwenstein-Wertheim-Rochefort (1762–1814) and his first wife Princess Marie Leopoldine of Hohenlohe-Bartenstein. Dominic had inherited the title "Löwenstein-Wertheim-Rochefort" in 1780 but modified it to "Löwenstein-Wertheim-Rosenberg" in 1789. His maternal grandparents were Joseph Nicholas, Count of Windisch-Graetz and his second wife Duchess Leopoldine of Arenberg (1751–1812).

Dominic Constantine was the eldest son of Theodore Alexander, Prince of Löwenstein-Wertheim-Rochefort (1722–1780) and his wife Catharine Louise Eleonore, Countess of Leiningen-Dagsburg-Hartenburg.

Theodore Alexander was a son of Dominic Marquard, Prince of Löwenstein-Wertheim-Rochefort (1690–1735) and his wife Princess Christina of Hesse-Wanfried. Christina was a daughter of Charles, Landgrave of Hesse-Wanfried. Charles was the second son of Ernest, Landgrave of Hesse-Rheinfels.

Dominic Marquard was a son of Maximilian Karl Albert, Prince of Löwenstein-Wertheim-Rochefort (1656–1718) and his wife Polyxena Maria, Countess Khuen von Lichtenberg und Belasi. His father had served as governor of Milan, representing Charles VI, Holy Roman Emperor until his own death.

Maximilian was a son of Ferdinand Karl, Count of Löwenstein-Wertheim-Rochefort (1616–1672) and his wife Anna Maria, Countess of Fürstenberg.

Ferdinand Karl was a son of Johann Dietrich, Count of Löwenstein-Wertheim-Rochefort (1585–1644) and his first wife Josina von der Marck.

Johann Dietrich was a younger son of Louis III, Count of Löwenstein-Wertheim (1530–1611) and his wife Anna, Countess of Stolberg. His father had served as governor of Styria, Carinthia and Carniola, representing rulers of the House of Habsburg.

Louis was a younger son of Frederick I, Count of Löwenstein (1502–1541) and his wife Countess Helene of Königsegg.

Frederick was a son of Louis I, Count of Löwenstein and his first wife Elisabeth, Countess of Montfort.

Louis was a son of Frederick I, Count Palatine of the Rhine and his morganatic wife Clara Tott. Children from this marriage had no right to the throne of the Palatinate but represented a secondary line of the Wittelsbach.

Marriage and children
On 31 May 1829, Constantine married Princess Agnes of Hohenlohe-Langenburg. She was a daughter of Charles Louis, Prince of Hohenlohe-Langenburg (1762–1825) and Amalia, Countess of Solms-Baruth. They had two children:

Adelaide of Löwenstein-Wertheim-Rosenberg (3 April 1831 – 16 December 1909). In 1851, she married the former King Miguel of Braganza, who reigned in Portugal from 1828 to 1834.
Charles, Prince of Löwenstein-Wertheim-Rosenberg (21 May 1834 – 8 November 1921). Married Princess Sophie of Liechtenstein. She was a daughter of Alois II, Prince of Liechtenstein and Countess Franziska Kinsky of Wchinitz and Tettau.

Ancestry

External links

His profile in Peerage.com

Sources
"Lines of Succession: Heraldry of the Royal Families of Europe" by Jirí Louda and Michael MacLagan.

1802 births
1838 deaths
People from Kleinheubach
House of Löwenstein-Wertheim-Rosenberg
Princes of Löwenstein-Wertheim-Rosenberg
Heirs apparent who never acceded